Nikolai Demidenko (born 1 July 1955, Anisimovo) is a Russian-born classical pianist.

Biography 
Demidenko studied at the Gnessin State Musical College with Anna Kantor and at the Moscow Conservatoire under Dmitri Bashkirov. He was a finalist at the 1976 Montreal International Piano Competition and the 1978 Tchaikovsky International Competition. He taught at the Yehudi Menuhin School in the UK, where he has been a resident since 1990.  He was granted British citizenship in 1995 and currently holds a visiting professorship at the University of Surrey. In addition to a vast amount of the standard Germanic and Russian repertory, he is a specialist of Frédéric Chopin and a noted champion of the works of neglected composers such as Muzio Clementi, Carl Maria von Weber, Jan Václav Voříšek, and Nikolai Medtner, as well as neglected works of well-known composers such as Domenico Scarlatti, Wolfgang Amadeus Mozart, Franz Schubert, and Robert Schumann, and transcriptions by Ferruccio Busoni.  Demidenko won a Gramophone Award in 1992 in the concerto category for his recording of the Medtner Piano Concertos No. 2 and 3.

Career 
In 2000, in connection with the 250th anniversary of the death of Johann Sebastian Bach, Nikolai Demidenko was one of four pianists invited to perform Das Wohltemperierte Klavier, subsequently released on DVD by EuroArts.

Demidenko´s extensive discography consists of nearly 40 CDs. For Hyperion Records he has recorded over 20 albums, including most recently Prokofiev Piano Concertos nos 2 & 3 with the London Philharmonic Orchestra released in March 2015, Gramophone Editor´s Choice award-winning album of Medtner and Music for two Pianos (with Dmitri Alexeev).

For the Munich-based AGPL label he has recorded Beethoven’s Hammerklavier Sonata, a collection of Scarlatti sonatas and a Chopin CD which won the Preis der Deutschen Schallplatten Kritik Preis. Autumn 2008 saw the release of a new Chopin CD, including his first recording of the 24 Preludes, for Onyx Classics. This CD won the MIDEM 2010 Special Chopin Award for a new recording, a unique occasion edited especially for a Bicentenary of Chopin. Demidenko was one of the pianists invited to perform Chopin Piano Concerto in E minor Op. 11 concert during the celebration of Bicentenary of Chopin organized by The Fryderyk Chopin Institute in Warsaw.  This concert was released on DVD by Music Accentus Music

In 2014 he was awarded an honorary doctorate from the University of Surrey in recognition of his outstanding contribution to the field of Music and the University.

References 

Russian classical pianists
Male classical pianists
Soviet classical pianists
20th-century classical pianists
British classical pianists
Academics of the University of Surrey
Moscow Conservatory alumni
Gnessin State Musical College alumni
Naturalised citizens of the United Kingdom
Soviet emigrants to the United Kingdom
1955 births
Living people
21st-century classical pianists
20th-century British male musicians
21st-century British male musicians